Orthochirus is a genus of scorpion in the family Buthidae, first described by Ferdinand Karsch in 1891.

Species 
Orthochirus contains the following fifty-seven species.

 Orthochirus afar Kovarik, Lowe & Stahlavsky, 2016
 Orthochirus afghanus Kovarik, 2004
 Orthochirus arenicola Lourenço & Ythier, 2021
 Orthochirus atarensis Lourenço & Leguin, 2011
 Orthochirus bastawadei Zambre, Mirza, Sanap, Upadhye & Javed, 2011
 Orthochirus bicolor (Pocock, 1897)
 Orthochirus birulai Kovarik, Fet & Yagmur, 2020
 Orthochirus carinatus Navidpour, Kovarik, Soleglad & Fet, 2019
 Orthochirus cloudsleythompsoni Lourenço & Leguin, 2011
 Orthochirus danielleae (Lourenço & Vachon, 1997)
 Orthochirus farzanpayi (Vachon & Farzanpay, 1987)
 Orthochirus feti Kovarik, 2004
 Orthochirus flavescens (Pocock, 1897)
 Orthochirus fomichevi Kovarik, Yagmur, Fet & Hussen, 2019
 Orthochirus formozovi Kovarik, Fet & Yagmur, 2020
 Orthochirus fuscipes (Pocock, 1900)
 Orthochirus gantenbeini Kovarik, Yagmur, Fet & Hussen, 2019
 Orthochirus glabrifrons (Kraepelin, 1903)
 Orthochirus gromovi Kovarik, 2004
 Orthochirus grosseri Kovarik, Fet & Yagmur, 2020
 Orthochirus gruberi Kovarik & Fet, 2006
 Orthochirus hormozganensis Kovarik & Navidpour, 2020
 Orthochirus heratensis Kovarik, 2004
 Orthochirus innesi Simon, 1910
 Orthochirus iranus Kovarik, 2004
 Orthochirus iraqus Kovarik, 2004
 Orthochirus jalalabadensis Kovarik, 2004
 Orthochirus kaspareki (Lourenço & Huber, 2000)
 Orthochirus kermanensis Kovarik & Navidpour, 2020
 Orthochirus kinzelbachi (Lourenço & Huber, 2000)
 Orthochirus kovariki Yagmur & Khalili, 2022
 Orthochirus krishnai Tikader & Bastawade, 1983
 Orthochirus kryzhanovskyi Kovarik, Fet & Yagmur, 2020
 Orthochirus kucerai Kovarik & Navidpour, 2020
 Orthochirus masihipouri Kovarik & Navidpour, 2020
 Orthochirus maroccanus Lourenço & Leguin, 2011
 Orthochirus melanurus (Kessler, 1874)
 Orthochirus mesopotamicus Birula, 1918
 Orthochirus milloti Lourenço, 2021
 Orthochirus minor Lourenço, Duhem & Cloudsley-Thompson, 2012
 Orthochirus monodi (Lourenço & Vachon, 1997)
 Orthochirus navidpouri Kovarik, Yagmur, Fet & Hussen, 2019
 Orthochirus nordmanni Kovarik, Fet & Yagmur, 2020
 Orthochirus olivaceus (Karsch, 1881)
 Orthochirus pallidus (Pocock, 1897)
 Orthochirus persa (Birula, 1900)
 Orthochirus samrchelsis Kovarik, 2004
 Orthochirus scrobiculosus (Grube, 1873)
 Orthochirus sejnai Kovarik, Fet & Yagmur, 2020
 Orthochirus semnanensis Kovarik & Navidpour, 2020
 Orthochirus soufiensis Lourenco & Sadine, 2021
 Orthochirus stockwelli (Lourenço & Vachon, 1995)
 Orthochirus tassili Lourenço & Leguin, 2011
 Orthochirus tibesti Lourenço, Duhem & Cloudsley-Thompson, 2012
 Orthochirus varius Kovarik, 2004
 Orthochirus vignolii Kovarik & Navidpour, 2020
 Orthochirus zagrosensis Kovarik, 2004

References 

Scorpion genera